The O'Neill Site, also designated 20CX18, is an archaeological site located about 5 km south Charlevoix, Michigan. It was listed on the National Register of Historic Places in 1971.

It is a partially stratified Late Woodland period site, located near the mouth of Inwood Creek. Occupation of the site spanned approximately AD 1000 - 1455. Numerous stone tools, pottery, and house remains were found at the site.

References

National Register of Historic Places in Charlevoix County, Michigan
Archaeological sites on the National Register of Historic Places in Michigan